37 Minutes and 48 Seconds with Sonny Stitt is an album by saxophonist Sonny Stitt that was released by Roost.

Track listing

Personnel 
Sonny Stitt – alto saxophone
Dolo Coker – piano
Edgar Willis – bass
Kenny Dennis – drums

References 

1957 albums
Sonny Stitt albums
Roost Records albums
Albums produced by Teddy Reig